William Wrigley may refer to:

William Wrigley Jr., founder of William Wrigley Jr. Company (1st generation confectionery magnate)
William Wrigley III, 3rd generation confectionery magnate
William Wrigley Jr. II, 4th generation confectionery magnate

See also
Wrigley (disambiguation)